"You Make Me Sick" is a song by American singer Pink for her debut studio album Can't Take Me Home (2000). It was written by Brainz Dimilo, Anthony President, and Mark Tabb, while production was helmed by Dimilo, President and Babyface. It was released as the third and final single from Can't Take Me Home on November 27, 2000, by LaFace Records and Arista Records.

A moderate chart success, it peaked at number 33 on the US Billboard Hot 100 and number nine on the UK Singles Chart. The accompanying music video for "You Make Me Sick" was filmed in late 2000 and was directed by Dave Meyers, whom Pink collaborated with previously on the first two music videos from Can't Take Me Home.

Critical reception
Allmusic highlighted the song. Q magazine did the same.

Chart performance
The song was a top-10 success in the United Kingdom, reaching number nine, and in New Zealand, reaching number 10. The song peaked at number 25 in Australia, where it sold over 35,000 copies and was accredited gold.

Track listings
 UK CD single
 "You Make Me Sick" (Radio Mix) - 4:12
 "You Make Me Sick" (El B Remix) - 5:58
 "You Make Me Sick" (Dub Conspiracy Remix) - 5:34

 UK Cassette single
 "You Make Me Sick" (Radio Mix) - 4:12
 "You Make Me Sick" (Dub Conspiracy Remix) - 5:34

 American CD single
 "You Make Me Sick" (DaMo's Radio Mix) - 3:57
 "You Make Me Sick" (HQ2 Big Room Radio Vocal Mix) - 3:37
 "You Make Me Sick" (HQ2 Big Room Club Vocal Mix) - 7:53
 "You Make Me Sick" (Radio Mix) - 4:12
 "You Make Me Sick" (Instrumental) - 4:30

 American CD single - Limited Edition
 "You Make Me Sick" (Radio Mix) - 4:12
 "Most Girls" (Skribble & Anthony Acid Club Mix) - 8:54
 "Most Girls" (Skribble & Anthony Acid Radio Mix) - 3:43

 Australian CD single
 "You Make Me Sick" (Radio Mix) - 4:12
 "Most Girls" (Skribble & Anthony Acid Club Mix) - 8:54
 "Most Girls" (Skribble & Anthony Acid Radio Mix) - 3:43
 "Enhanced Section"

 European CD single
 "You Make Me Sick" (Radio Mix) - 4:12
 "You Make Me Sick" (Dub Conspiracy Remix) - 5:34

 German CD single
 "You Make Me Sick" (Radio Mix) - 4:12
 "You Make Me Sick" (El B Remix) - 5:58
 "You Make Me Sick" (Dub Conspiracy Remix) - 5:34
 "You Make Me Sick" (Album Version) - 4:10
 "You Make Me Sick" (Instrumental) - 4:30

Personnel
Personnel are adapted from the Can't Take Me Home liner notes.

 Pink: lead and background vocals
 Anthony President: writer, producer, all instruments and drum programming
 Brainz Dimilo: writer, producer, additional drum programming
 Mark Tabb: writer
 Babyface: producer
 Sherree Ford-Payne: background vocals

 Paul Boutin, Edward Quesada: recording
 Manny Marroquin: mixing
 Victor McCoy: assistant engineer
 Ivy Skoff: production coordinator

Charts

Certifications

Release history

References

External links
 

2000 singles
2000 songs
Arista Records singles
LaFace Records singles
Music videos directed by Dave Meyers (director)
Pink (singer) songs
Song recordings produced by Babyface (musician)